Mill Mountain is a large flat-topped mountain,  high, forming the eastern end of Festive Plateau in the Cook Mountains of Antarctica. This mountain was probably sighted by the British National Antarctic Expedition (1901–04) under Captain Robert F. Scott, who gave the name "Mount Mill," after British Antarctic historian Hugh Robert Mill, to a summit in the nearby Reeves Bluffs. This area was mapped by the United States Geological Survey from surveys and U.S. Navy photography (1959–63). A prominent mountain does not rise from the bluffs, and since the name "Mount Mill" is in use elsewhere in Antarctica, the Advisory Committee on Antarctic Names (1965) altered the original name to Mill Mountain and applied it to the prominent mountain described.

References

Mountains of Oates Land